Brad Lamm (born 1966) is the founder of residential trauma clinic and hospital Breathe Life Healing Center, an American interventionist, educator and author of many books including How to Help the One You Love: A New Way to Intervene (2010). How to Help details the theory and practice of a system of psychosocial invitation-based intervention named "Breakfree Intervention", which trains and utilizes "voices that matter" (the friends and family of an identified loved one) as an ongoing "circle of change". He owns and operates Intervention.com as a family resource for those seeking help to intervene to help one they love with physical agency locations in New York City, Cape Cod and Los Angeles. Lamm is also the author of Just 10 Lbs (2011), a self-help book on the diet-obsessed public's "need to feed" and what he describes as “emotional eating” in the face of mounting evidence of the dangers of restrictive eating, fad diets and binge eating trends.

Early life and education 
Lamm was born in 1966 in Wenatchee, Washington, the youngest of four brothers. His father was an Evangelical Quaker minister and he grew up in a highly religious home where his mother was pre-occupied with religious Armageddon, prophesy and the "end times." The family moved to Eugene, Oregon in 1968, where he attended public school until the middle of his sophomore year at Winston Churchill High School. In 1982 the family moved to Yorba Linda, California, where his father became Senior Pastor of Yorba Linda Friends Church, the largest Friends Church in the nation. Lamm attended Whittier Christian High School, the University of California, Los Angeles and Pennsylvania State University. Lamm is a lifelong Quaker, who launched Spark Recovery (2013), an interfaith peer to peer support network. His short story, It Hurts a Little, was featured in Newsweek (2018) on the anniversary of his cover story Gays Under Fire. It became the basis for an announced documentary by the same name. He is an ordained interfaith teacher.

From university to career 
After college, Lamm lived in Kamakura, Japan, for over a year before settling in New York City, where he worked producing television news programs and writing music. Dubbed the "once reigning king of the late night party scene", he wrote for and hosted the syndicated entertainment TV show Party Talk, seen in New York, Los Angeles and six other US markets. In 1994, he relocated to work as a weatherman in Boise, Idaho and then Washington, D.C., where he worked as a network television weather anchor, working while abusing both drugs and alcohol. Lamm opened nightclubs in Washington, D.C. and Denver in 2001, but entered a drug and alcohol rehabilitation program in February 2003. His subjective experiences of his own rehabilitation, combined with his study with and mentorship by Boulder, Colorado psychiatrist Dr. Judith Landau on the efficacy of the family-centered process in helping addicts overcome addiction. Landau's work on the evidence-based best-practice invitational intervention known as ARISE (A Relational Intervention Sequence of Events), is based on the studies Landau co-authored while at the University of Pennsylvania. ARISE Invitational Intervention is an alternative to the Johnson Intervention, and is part of a more comprehensive model designed to maximize successful engagement with a minimum amount of professional time and effort.

Lamm has asserted that substance abusers with strong familial and social support systems are five times as likely to succeed in their goal of sobriety as persons lacking support. He calls this supportive system a "firewall".
Lamm was a founding member of Mehmet Oz's "Experts" team
and has presented to Parliament on Trauma’s Link to Behavioral Health Suffering, as well as to the UK-European Symposium on Addictive Disorders. Lamm also speaks and works on issues of eating disorders, food and obesity with individuals and organizations. With the consent of the addict, Lamm's program works with family members, co-workers, partners, employers and friends to develop and implement a plan of change and a recovery model. He conducts trainings and workshops in his method of Breakfree Intervention.
He is a proponent of the notion that, for the person with a serious problem, loving peer groups and family members are vitally important for effective personal change.

In 2011, Lamm created and produced the eight part docu-series Addicted to Food for the Oprah Winfrey Network. The series follows the day-to-day lives of eight patients that have been diagnosed with an eating disorder as they work to improve their lives and overcome their self-harming cycle of over-feeding. His book on lifestyle intervention relating to one's "need to feed" and food addiction, Just 10 Lbs: Easy Steps to Weighing What You Want (Finally) was published along with the accompanying workbook. Also in 2011, what began as a wellness program for Walmart employees, became the most successful commercial stop-smoking campaign of all time: "Blueprint to Quit", sponsored by GlaxoSmithKline and available exclusively at Walmart. Lamm's book "Stop It: 4 Steps in 4 Weeks to Quit Smoking Now" focusses on a breathing protocol, the need for community support in addition to the necessity of a proper detox from nicotine.

Trauma treatment & Breathe Life Healing Center
In early 2012, Lamm's innovative complex-trauma treatment rehab program, Breathe Life Healing Center, opened in the Gramercy Park neighborhood of New York City, and features a "flexible, sliding scale-style approach to payment". Breathe's second center opened in West Hollywood, and sits on 22 acres within a gated community with nine residences on a Campus setting including an biodynamic farm. Breathe Life Healing Centers paradigm in trauma treatment expanded his work to include a groundbreaking long-term retreat model to "ignite personal recovery and spiritual discovery". Clients there are treated for primary mental health, substance use, eating disorders or primary trauma in specific units. Kathleen Murphy, LPC, serves as Breathe's founding Executive Clinical Director and leads Breathe's Family Education Programs. Breathe Life Healing Centers are an insurance-friendly trauma-informed recovery program combining a residential retreat center featuring non-clinical, spiritual-directed work, with a traditional treatment center, where a sophisticated clinical program is offered. Breathe's unified recovery approach invites those with chemical dependency, dual-diagnosis and eating disorders (Binge Eating Disorder, Compulsive Overeating, Metabolic Syndrome and Bulimia) to create community and progress through trauma healing, emotional regulation skills-building and spiritual development.

Breathe Life Healing Centers is one of the few treatment centers offering residential treatment for clients working to recover from binge eating disorder.

Journalism, activism and media 
Lamm appeared in Newsweek in 1991 as an activist for social justice and equality. In September 1992, he appeared on the cover of the magazine's "Gays Under Fire" issue, which reported on limited national support for LGBT rights. Nearly 24 years later, Newsweek published Lamm's account of being attacked by five men in New York, among other updates since his cover appearance.

Lamm is "Oprah's interventionist" and was a member of the Core Team Oz team who launched The Dr. Oz Show. He is "Dr. Oz's Interventionist", has worked to help families on the Dr. Phil Show and is a regular guest on The Today Show and others. Lamm and makes frequent contributions to television and radio programs including Good Morning America, The View, CBS This Morning, The Nancy Grace Show, and lists Dr. Mehmet Oz, Nancy Grace, Alice Walker, Roseanne Barr, Mariel Hemingway and Oprah Winfrey among his endorsers. Lamm is a regular columnist on Oprah.com and DoctorOZ.com, as well as a contributor at Oprah.com.

The America Recovers podcast, co-hosted by Mackenzie Phillips, launched with Westbrook Media in March 2021. Regular contributors include trauma therapist Anisha Cooper & The Recovery Detective Joseph Regan. Special guests include Billy Porter, Billy Baldwin & Carnie Wilson.

Marriage and personal life 
In 2008, Lamm married Emmy, Tony and Grammy winning television and theatrical producer Scott Sanders in a ceremony officiated by novelist Alice Walker. He splits his time between Provincetown, Los Angeles & NYC.

Bibliography

Books

Articles

References 

1966 births
Living people
American male writers
American television meteorologists
Educators from California
Educators from Oregon
American LGBT writers
LGBT people from Washington (state)
Pennsylvania State University alumni
People from Wenatchee, Washington
University of California, Los Angeles alumni
Writers from California
Writers from Eugene, Oregon
Writers from Washington (state)
Winston Churchill High School (Eugene, Oregon) alumni
21st-century LGBT people